The blackhead salmon (Narcetes stomias) is a species of fish in the family Alepocephalidae (slickheads).

Classification

Despite the common name, it is not a true salmon, which are in the genus Salmo and are in the distant Salmoniformes order. Its specific name is from Greek στομίας (stomias, "hard-mouthed").<ref>The American Encyclopaedic Dictionary: A Thoroughly Accurate, Practical & Exhaustive Work of Reference to All the Words in the English Language ...%2C%20%22hard-mouthed%22)&f=false</ref>

Description

The blackhead salmon is blackish in colour.

Habitat

Reproduction

The trematode worm Olssonium turneri'' (family Fellodistomidae) is a parasite upon it.

References

Alepocephalidae
Fish described in 1890
Taxa named by Charles Henry Gilbert